The 2000 E3 Harelbeke was the 43rd edition of the E3 Harelbeke cycle race and was held on 25 March 2000. The race started and finished in Harelbeke. The race was won by Sergei Ivanov of the Farm Frites team.

General classification

References

2000 in Belgian sport
2000